The Song of the Lark may refer to:

 The Song of the Lark (painting), an 1884 painting by Jules Breton
 The Song of the Lark (novel), a 1915 novel by Willa Cather